Northwestern Switzerland is the common name of the region of Switzerland encompassing the cantons of Basel-Stadt, Basel-Landschaft and Aargau. It is one of the NUTS-2 regions of Switzerland.

References

Regions of Switzerland
NUTS 2 statistical regions of the European Union